Shiyakusho-mae Station is the name of nine train stations in Japan:

 Shiyakusho-mae Station (Aichi)
 Shiyakusho-mae Station (Chiba)
 Shiyakusho-mae Station (Ehime)
 Shiyakusho-mae Station (Hiroshima)
 Shiyakusho-mae Station (Hokkaido)
 Shiyakusho-mae Station (Kagoshima)
 Shiyakusho-mae Station (Kumamoto)
 Shiyakushomae Station (Nagano)
 Shiyakusho-mae Station (Wakayama)

Shiyakusho-mae Station is also a former name of following train station:
 Fukui Castle Ruins-daimyomachi Station